The Lowtalker EP is an extended play by Menace Beach.

References

2014 EPs